Lewis Wesley Warrington (born 10 October 2002) is an English professional footballer who plays for Fleetwood Town, on loan from Everton as a midfielder.

Career
Warrington began his career at Everton, joining the club at the age of six. In January 2022, he joined League Two side Tranmere Rovers on loan. Following the loan deal, he signed a new two-year contract. On 23 August 2022, he made his senior debut for Everton as a substitute in a 1–0 win over Fleetwood Town in the EFL Cup.

He moved on loan to Fleetwood Town on 1 September 2022.

References

2002 births
Living people
English footballers
Everton F.C. players
Tranmere Rovers F.C. players
Fleetwood Town F.C. players
English Football League players
Association football midfielders